Assistens Cemetery is the name of a number of cemeteries in Denmark. The common nominator is, as the first part of the name implies (Latin: assistens meaning assisting), an assisting cemetery for a town's churches. Already by the end of the 17th century, Danish authorities deemed that the conditions for inner-city cemeteries were becoming increasingly unacceptable. Not only was the space becoming limited but it was also deemed unhygienic to conduct burial in the inner-city. The solution was to erect shared cemeteries in the outskirt of a town, named Assisting Cemetery, primarily in larger towns. The first of these in Nørrebro, Copenhagen, was founded by royal resolution on May 26, 1757, and inaugurated November 6, 1760.

Many of the cemeteries original founded in the outskirt of a town, now once again find themselves surrounded by the town, as it has grown over the years.

 Assistens Kirkegård (Birkerød)
 Assistens Kirkegård (Fredericia)
 Assistens Kirkegård (Haderslev)
 Assistens Kirkegård (Copenhagen, founded 1757, inaugurated 1760)
 Assistens Kirkegård (Køge)
 Assistens Kirkegård (Lyngby)
 Assistens Kirkegård (Nyborg)
 Assistens Kirkegård (Odense, inaugurated 1811)
 Assistens Kirkegård (Skagen, inaugurated 1884)
 Assistens Kirkegård (Svendborg)
 Assistens Ny Kirkegård (Nørresundby)

Cemeteries in Denmark
Lutheran cemeteries
Parks in Copenhagen
Tourist attractions in Denmark